The Rugby League Federation Ghana is the governing body for the sport of rugby league in Ghana. The RLFG was formed on 6 April 2014.

See also

 Ghana national rugby league team

References

Rugby league in Africa
Sports governing bodies in Ghana
Rugby league governing bodies
Sports organizations established in 2014